The Al-Quwaisat class is a series of  Landing Ship Tanks (LSTs) of the United Arab Emirates Navy (UAE Navy). They were built by the Malaysian company Shin Yang based on the company's 80 m LST design. Two ships have been completed and in service with UAE Navy with one more on order.

Characteristics
The ship has a complement of 106. The LSTs have a capacity to carry cargo, marine troops, tanks and helicopters. The ships are armed with light defensive weapons such as 12.7 mm Browning M2HB machine guns.

Service history
The Al-Quwaisat class took part in UAE Navy operations in the Yemen conflict. They were involved in a logistic role to support allied forces in the operation.

Ships of the class

References

Ships of the United Arab Emirates Navy